Hecuba (minor planet designation: 108 Hecuba) is a fairly large and bright main-belt asteroid. It was discovered by Karl Theodor Robert Luther on 2 April 1869, and named after Hecuba, wife of King Priam in the legends of the Trojan War in Greek Mythology. This object is orbiting the Sun with a period of 5.83 years and an eccentricity of 0.06. It became the first asteroid discovered to orbit near a 2:1 mean-motion resonance with the planet Jupiter, and is the namesake of the Hecuba group of asteroids.

In the Tholen classification system, it is categorized as a stony S-type asteroid, while the Bus asteroid taxonomy system lists it as an Sw asteroid. Observations performed at the Palmer Divide Observatory in Colorado Springs, Colorado in during 2007 produced a light curve with a period of 17.859 ± 0.005 hours with a brightness variation of 0.11 ± 0.02 in magnitude.

Hecuba orbits within the Hygiea family of asteroids but is not otherwise related to other family members because it has a silicate composition; Hygieas are dark C-type asteroids.

References

External links 
 Lightcurve plot of 108 Hecuba, Palmer Divide Observatory, B. D. Warner (2007)
 Asteroid Lightcurve Database (LCDB), query form (info )
 Dictionary of Minor Planet Names, Google books
 Asteroids and comets rotation curves, CdR – Observatoire de Genève, Raoul Behrend
 Discovery Circumstances: Numbered Minor Planets (1)-(5000) – Minor Planet Center
 
 

000108
000108
000108
Discoveries by Robert Luther
Named minor planets
18690402